Montres DOXA S.A., is an independent Swiss watch manufacturer founded in 1889.  Doxa is best known for its dive watches.

Between 1968 and 1978 DOXA became part of Synchron S.A. In 1978 DOXA S.A. was acquired by Aubrey  Frères S.A. and then was sold to the Jenny family in 1997. In 2002 Doxa introduced re-editions of its watches and timepieces in limited quantities.

History

Doxa, founded in 1889 by Georges Ducommun, began as a maker of dress watches and other timepieces.  Over the years, Doxa gained in size and branched out into other timekeeping markets.

In the late 1960s Doxa decided to devote resources to create a watch to be used for diving.  Tests indicated that an orange face was more visible in murky water.  Doxa also consulted with divers, including Jacques Cousteau, then chairman of "U.S. Divers," and Claude Wesly (a Cousteau companion and the first man to spend seven days thirty-three feet underwater). A staff of engineers and professional divers was assembled to create a watch with the required features. The Sub300t was purchased in quantity by U.S. Divers, who resold the watch in the United States.

The Doxa Sub300t features an orange face, intended to make it more visible in the water.  It has a rotating bezel with the official US Navy air dive table for no-decompression dives engraved onto its surface.  The watch could be used to calculate decompression times, and other information useful to divers.  It was rated to work 300 meters below sea level, and later versions were introduced that could work up to 750 meters below sea level. Other watchmakers then followed with similar bezels, as well as different watch faces.

Soon after the introduction of the Sub300t, the Swiss watch industry was hard-hit economically by the introduction of quartz watches.  Accurate, reliable and small timepieces could now be made without the mechanical movements that the Swiss specialized in constructing.  In response, Doxa joined a group of Swiss watchmakers to consolidate resources.  This eventually failed and Doxa, after being sold, ceased operations in about 1980.

The Jenny family of Switzerland now owns the brand.

Doxa began production of 92 limited edition Sub1000t series watches to support Project AWARE in 2008. In 2012, Doxa began a second production of their Sub1200t series with Project AWARE that contained 300 watches. A portion of the sale of each watch goes to support Project AWARE.

Naming conventions

Doxa's dive watches adhere to the following naming conventions.

 "Professional" refers to an orange-faced dive watch
 "Sharkhunter" refers to a black-faced dive watch
 "Searambler" refers to a silver (metallic)-faced dive watch
 "Caribbean" refers to a blue-faced dive watch
 "Divingstar" refers to a yellow-faced dive watch
 "Aquamarine" refers to a turquoise-faced dive watch
 "Whitepearl" refers to a white-faced dive watch

See also

 List of watch manufactures

References

External links
DOXA Watches official web site
 DOXA SUB 300T Sharkhunter
DOXA Sub 300T Professional Aqua Lung
1969 DOXA Sub 300T Searambler Aqua-Lung
The Restoration Of A Doxa 300T Searambler
Diver Marco Thier and his possibly unique Golden Doxa Sub 300
Vintage Eye for the Modern Guy: DOXA SUB 300 Professional 50th Anniversary Edition
The Doxa Sub 300, The Dive Watch Personified
BASELWORLD 2017: DOXA SUB
HALL OF FAME: DOXA SUB 300T
TBT THE LEGENDARY DOXA SUB 300T SHARKHUNTER
300T-Graph Chronograph Watches Hands-On
Glory under the Seas: The Doxa Sub 300T 
In-Depth A Look At The Doxa SUB 200 T-Graph Searambler
Doxa Sub 1200T Searambler Review

Swiss watch brands
Swiss companies established in 1889
Manufacturing companies established in 1889
Watch manufacturing companies of Switzerland